is a Japanese manga series written and illustrated by NON. It was serialized in Shueisha's seinen manga magazine Weekly Young Jump from January 2010 to June 2012, with its chapters collected in eleven tankōbon volumes.

Publication
Shueisha collected its chapters in eleven tankōbon volumes, released from May 19, 2010, to July 19, 2012.

Volume list

See also
Harem Marriage, another manga series by the same author
Adabana, another manga series by the same author

References

Further reading

External links
 

Seinen manga
Sex comedy anime and manga
Shueisha manga